Stephen George Wheatcroft  (born 1 June 1947) is a Professorial Fellow of the School of Historical Studies, University of Melbourne. His research interests include Russian pre-revolutionary and Soviet social, economic and demographic history, as well as  famine and food supply problems in modern world history, the impact of media on history, and in recent developments in Russian and Ukrainian society. Wheatcroft speaks Russian fluently and has spent a good portion of his career researching in the Soviet archives, and he played a major role in publishing materials from the archives.

Wheatcroft was named a fellow of the Academy of the Social Sciences in Australia in 2005.

Selected works

Books

(co-editor; publication of archival materials) The Tragedy of the Soviet Village, 1927-1939 2001  in Russian

Articles

References

Australian historians
Living people
Fellows of the Academy of the Social Sciences in Australia
1947 births
Writers about Russia
Academic staff of the University of Melbourne